John Simmons Barth (born May 27, 1930) is an American writer who is best known for his postmodern and metafictional fiction. His most highly regarded and influential works were published in the 1960s, and include The Sot-Weed Factor, a satirical retelling of Maryland's colonial history, and Lost in the Funhouse, a self-referential and experimental collection of short stories. Though Barth's work has been controversial among critics and readers, he was co-recipient of the National Book Award in 1973 for his novel Chimera with John Williams for Augustus. Despite Barth's influence on postmodern literature in America, his influence and publicity have decreased since his novels were published.

Life
John Barth, called "Jack", was born in Cambridge, Maryland. He has an older brother, Bill, and a twin sister Jill. In 1947 he graduated from Cambridge High School, where he played drums and wrote for the school newspaper. He briefly studied "Elementary Theory and Advanced Orchestration" at Juilliard before attending Johns Hopkins University, where he received a B.A. in 1951 and an M.A. in 1952. His thesis novel, The Shirt of Nessus, drew on his experiences at Johns Hopkins.

Barth married Harriet Anne Strickland on January 11, 1950. He published two short stories that same year, one in Johns Hopkins's student literary magazine and one in The Hopkins Review. His daughter, Christine Ann, was born in the summer of 1951. His son, John Strickland, was born the following year.

From 1953 to 1965, Barth was a professor at Pennsylvania State University, where he met his second and current wife, Shelly Rosenberg. His third child, Daniel Stephen, was born in 1954. During the "American high Sixties", he moved to teach at the State University of New York at Buffalo from 1965 to 1973. In that period he came to know "the remarkable short fiction" of the Argentine Jorge Luis Borges, which inspired his collection Lost in the Funhouse.

Barth later taught at Boston University as a visiting professor in 1972–73 and at Johns Hopkins University from 1973 until he retired in 1995.

Literary work
Barth began his career with The Floating Opera and The End of the Road, two short realist novels that deal wittily with controversial topics, suicide and abortion respectively. They are straightforward realistic tales; as Barth later remarked, they "didn't know they were novels".

The Sot-Weed Factor (1960) was initially intended as the completing novel of a trilogy comprising his first two "realist" novels, but, as a consequence of Barth's maturation as a writer, it developed into a different project. The novel is significant as it marked Barth's discovery of postmodernism.

Barth's next novel, Giles Goat-Boy (about 800 pages), is a speculative fiction based on the conceit of the university as universe. Giles, a boy raised as a goat, discovers his humanity and becomes a savior in a story presented as a computer tape given to Barth, who denied that it was his work. In the course of the novel Giles carries out all the tasks prescribed by Joseph Campbell in The Hero with a Thousand Faces. Barth kept a list of the tasks taped to his wall while he was writing the book.

The short story collection Lost in the Funhouse (1968) and the novella collection Chimera (1972) are even more metafictional than their two predecessors, foregrounding the writing process and presenting achievements such as a seven-deep nested quotation. Chimera shared the U.S. National Book Award for Fiction.

In the novel LETTERS (1979), Barth interacts with characters from his first six books.

His 1994 Once Upon a Time: A Floating Opera, reuses stock characters, stock situations and formulas.

Styles, approaches and artistic criteria
Barth's work is characterized by a historical awareness of literary tradition and by the practice of rewriting typical of postmodernism. He said, "I don't know what my view of history is, but insofar as it involves some allowance for repetition and recurrence, reorchestration, and reprise [...] I would always want it to be more in the form of a thing circling out and out and becoming more inclusive each time." In Barth's postmodern sensibility, parody is a central device.

Around 1972, in an interview, Barth declared that "The process [of making a novel] is the content, more or less."

Barth's fiction continues to maintain a precarious balance between postmodern self-consciousness and wordplay and the sympathetic characterization and "page-turning" plotting commonly associated with more traditional genres and subgenres of classic and contemporary storytelling.

Essays
While writing these books, Barth was also pondering and discussing the theoretical problems of fiction writing.

In 1967, he wrote a highly influential and, to some, controversial essay considered a manifesto of postmodernism, The Literature of Exhaustion (first printed in The Atlantic, 1967). It depicts literary realism as a "used-up" tradition; Barth's description of his own work, which many thought illustrated a core trait of postmodernism, is "novels which imitate the form of a novel, by an author who imitates the role of author".

The essay was widely considered a statement of "the death of the novel", (compare with Roland Barthes' "The Death of the Author"). Barth has since insisted that he was merely making clear that a particular stage in history was passing, and pointing to possible directions from there. He later (1980) wrote a follow-up essay, "The Literature of Replenishment", to clarify the point.

Awards
1956 — National Book Award finalist for The Floating Opera
1966 — National Institute of Arts and Letters grant in literature
1965 — The Brandeis University creative arts award in fiction
1965-66 — The Rockefeller Foundation grant in fiction
1968 — Nominated for the National Book Award for Lost in the Funhouse
1973 — Shared the National Book Award for Chimera with John Edward Williams for Augustus
1974 — Elected to the American Academy of Arts and Letters
1974 — Fellow of the American Academy of Arts and Sciences
1997 — F. Scott Fitzgerald Award for Outstanding Achievement in American Fiction 
1998 — Lannan Foundation Lifetime Achievement Award
1998 — PEN/Malamud Award for Excellence in the Short Story
1999 — Enoch Pratt Society's Lifetime Achievement in Letters Award
2008 — Roozi Rozegari, Iranian literature prize for best foreign work translation The Floating Opera

Selected works

Fiction
The Floating Opera (1956)
The End of the Road (1958)
The Sot-Weed Factor (1960)
Giles Goat-Boy, or, The Revised New Syllabus (1966)
Lost in the Funhouse: Fiction for Print, Tape, Live Voice (stories) (1968)
Chimera (three linked novellas) (1972)
LETTERS (1979)
Sabbatical: A Romance (1982)
The Tidewater Tales (1987)
The Last Voyage of Somebody the Sailor (1991)
Once Upon a Time: A Floating Opera (memoirish novel) (1994)
On with the Story (stories) (1996)
Coming Soon!!!: A Narrative (2001)
The Book of Ten Nights and a Night: Eleven Stories (2004)
Where Three Roads Meet (three linked novellas) (2005)
The Development: Nine Stories (2008)
Every Third Thought: A Novel in Five Seasons (2011)
Collected Stories (2015)

Nonfiction
The Friday Book: Essays and Other Nonfiction (1984)
Further Fridays: Essays, Lectures, and Other Nonfiction, 1984-1994 (1995)
Final Fridays: Essays, Lectures, Tributes & Other Nonfiction, 1995- (2012)
Postscripts (or Just Desserts): Some Final Scribblings (2022)

See also
 Maryland literature

Notes and references

Further reading
Rovit, Earl, "The Novel as Parody: John Barth." Critique 6 (Fall 1963).

 Dean, Gabrielle, and Charles B. Harris, eds. (2016). John Barth: A Body of Words. Dalkey Archive Press. 978-1-56478-869-6

External links
 Vida, Obra y Libros usados de John Barth

 

North American Postmodern Fiction: John Barth
 Barth audio goodies at the Lannan site
 Barth on KCRW's radio program 'Bookworm' with Michael Silverblatt
  click!, a short story by John Barth centered on hypertextuality
National Book Awards Acceptance Speech 

20th-century American novelists
20th-century American male writers
American short story writers
American parodists
Parody novelists
Postmodern writers
Fellows of the American Academy of Arts and Sciences
Members of the American Academy of Arts and Letters
National Book Award winners
People from Cambridge, Maryland
Novelists from Maryland
Boston University faculty
Johns Hopkins University alumni
Johns Hopkins University faculty
Juilliard School alumni
Pennsylvania State University faculty
University at Buffalo faculty
PEN/Malamud Award winners
1930 births
Living people
21st-century American novelists
American male novelists
American male short story writers
Novelists from Pennsylvania
Novelists from Massachusetts
Novelists from New York (state)
21st-century American male writers